KF Kika is a professional football club from Kosovo which competes in the Second League. The club is based in Hogosht. Their home ground is the Kika Stadium which has a seating capacity of 500. Due to the COVID-19 pandemic, the second league got canceled which meant they were crowned champions.

See also
 List of football clubs in Kosovo

References

Football clubs in Kosovo
Association football clubs established in 1974
Kamenica, Kosovo